Rivalto is a village in Tuscany, central Italy, administratively a frazione of the comune of Chianni, province of Pisa. At the time of the 2001 census its population was 96.

Rivalto is about 45 km from Pisa and 3 km from Chianni.

Images

References 

Frazioni of the Province of Pisa